Maxwell George Lord (26 February 1925 – 2 June 2019) was a baseball player at the 1956 Melbourne Olympics.

References 

Baseball players at the 1956 Summer Olympics
Olympic baseball players of Australia
1925 births
2019 deaths